Jonathan Roger Aka (born September 13, 1986) is a French professional basketball player.

References

External links
LNB profile
FIBA profile

1986 births
Living people
Centers (basketball)
Élan Béarnais players
French men's basketball players
JA Vichy players
JDA Dijon Basket players
Metropolitans 92 players
Basketball players from Paris